Sheridan station may refer to:

Sheridan station (CTA), an 'L'  station in Chicago, Illinois
Sheridan station (RTD), a light rail station in Denver, Colorado
Sheridan Street station, a commuter rail station in Hollywood, Florida
Christopher Street–Sheridan Square station, a subway station in New York City, New York
Fort Sheridan station, a commuter rail station in Fort Sheridan, Illinois
Oxford–City of Sheridan station, a light rail station in Sheridan, Colorado